Acacia stenoptera, commonly known as narrow-winged wattle,  is a species of wattle that is endemic to the south-west of Western Australia.

Description
It can have a scrambling, sprawling or tangled erect habit. The shrub has ridged stems and curving spine-tipped phyllodes that form continuous wings along the stem.
It produces globular, cream or yellow flowerheads between March to December in the species' native range.

Taxonomy
The species was first formally described by the botanist George Bentham in 1842 as part of William Jackson Hooker work Notes on Mimoseae, with a synopsis of species as published in the London Journal of Botany.

The species was reclassified as Racosperma stenopterum in 2003 by Leslie Pedley then transferred back to the genus Acacia in 2006.

Distribution
The shrub is found from the Mid West, Wheatbelt, Peel, South West and Great Southern regions of Western Australia where it is found in a variety of habitats growing in sandy soils often around laterite.

See also
 List of Acacia species

References

External links
 World wide wattle: Acacia stenoptera. Accessed 29 May 2018.

stenoptera
Fabales of Australia
Acacias of Western Australia
Plants described in 1842
Taxa named by George Bentham